Cyclostrema eupoietum is a species of sea snail, a marine gastropod mollusk in the family Liotiidae.

Description
(Original description by Melvill) The height of the shell attains 1.5 mm and its diameter 2 mm. This is a small, narrowly umbilicated shell with four whorls. The last two whorls are very closely spirally lirately furrowed. The penultimate whorls is puncto-striate. The crenelations round the half-covered umbilicus are large in proportion to the size of the shell. The aperture is round. The peristome is continuous, hardly thickened, a tongue-shaped process, lirato-sulcate as is the rest of the surface, extending over the umbilical region.

Distribution
This species occurs in the Persian Gulf.

References

 Trew, A., 1984. The Melvill-Tomlin Collection. Part 30. Trochacea. Handlists of the Molluscan Collections in the Department of Zoology, National Museum of Wales

External links
 To World Register of Marine Species

eupoietum
Gastropods described in 1904